Project Gutenberg is a volunteer effort to digitize and archive cultural works under U.S. copyright law.

Project Gutenberg or Gutenberg project may also refer to:

 Project Gutenberg (film), (aka Mo Seung; 無雙) a 2018 Hong Kong crime thriller film
 Project Gutenberg Australia, a Project Gutenberg sister project under Australian copyright law
 Project Gutenberg Canada, a Project Gutenberg sister project under Canadian copyright law
 Project Gutenberg Encyclopedia or Encyclopædia Britannica Eleventh Edition

See also
 Gutenberg press, the original European printing press
 Gutenberg (disambiguation)
 Gutenburg (disambiguation)
 Guttenberg (disambiguation)